The 2013 Donegal Senior Football Championship was contested by senior Gaelic football clubs under the auspices of Donegal GAA.

Brian McEniff managed Réalt na Mara in the competition, taking over from Joe Keeney after his resignation and filling the position in his 71st year.

Format
The old format, which involved a two-legged first round, was scrapped in favour of an opening round containing four groups of four teams played out as a league and one team relegated. Two of the four teams in each group advanced to the quarter-finals after each have played the others once.

Teams finishing bottom of their group played two relegation semi-finals. The losing relegation semi-final teams met in the relegation final. The losing team was relegated to the Donegal Intermediate Football Championship to be replaced either by the Intermediate Championship winning team or the team finishing seventh in the All-County League Division Two. The match schedule was released in March 2013 and matches began over the June Bank Holiday weekend.

Donegal captain Michael Murphy begged the Donegal County Board to reconsider the scheduling of the Donegal Senior Football Championship as his team set out to defend the Sam Maguire Cup. Murphy described it as "probably not ideal from our situation" and despaired over "the hand we're dealt with" but said he would "like them to look after us in that way". They didn't.

Draw
The draw for the first round, made at the RTÉ Raidió na Gaeltachta studios in Derrybeg in February 2013, produced a "group of death" with only two from Glenwilly, St Michael's and Cill Chartha progressing to the quarter-finals. The 2012 finalists St Eunan's and Naomh Conaill were also placed in the same group.

Results

Group stage
Four Masters, St Michael's and Naomh Conaill, considered "big guns", failed to progress from their respective groups.

A

B

C

D

Relegation semi-finals

Relegation final

Knock-out stage

Quarter-finals
The draw for the quarter-finals took place on RTÉ Raidió na Gaeltachta on 9 July upon the completion of the group stage. All four group winners from the first round were defeated at the quarter-final stage, including defending champions St Eunan's.

Semi-finals
The draw for the semi-finals was made in Letterkenny on 15 September 2013.

Final
Ahead of the final Glenswilly player and Donegal captain Michael Murphy was named Ireland captain for the 2013 International Rules Series, creating a dilemma for the young pup and giving the Donegal County Board a headache due a fixture clash. The Donegal County Board ultimately decided not to move the final. Murphy did not captain Glenswilly - this honour fell to James Pat McDaid. Séamus Coleman attended the final.

References

Donegal Senior Football Championship
Donegal Senior Football Championship